The 2017 European Diving Championships was the fifth edition of the European Diving Championships and was held on 12–18 June 2017 in Kyiv, Ukraine.

Schedule
All times are local (UTC+03:00).

Participating nations

Results

Medal table

Men

Women

Mixed

Points table

A country that receives the most total points during the event officially becomes the European diving champion. Ukraine won the trophy with 244 points.

 The number of participants is shown in parentheses.
 The host is highlighted in blue.

References

External links
Results book

 
2017
2017
Diving in Ukraine
2017
European Diving Championships
European Diving Championships
Diving
June 2017 sports events in Europe
2010s in Kyiv